Back from the Dead is the fifth studio album by American rock band Halestorm. It was released on May 6, 2022, through Atlantic Records. The album was preceded by its title track, "Back from the Dead", which was released as a single in August 2021, followed by "The Steeple" in February 2022.

Background and production 
Halestorm began working on their fifth studio album slightly before the beginning of the COVID-19 pandemic in 2020. During the lockdown period, the band was forced to cease their customary schedule of frequent touring while finding ways to financially support their staff and crew. The band began formal work on the album in early 2021. Many of the album's lyrics are informed by singer/guitarist Lzzy Hale's experiences of self-discovery as a musician disconnected from fans and bandmates during the pandemic. Mental health is a common theme in the album's lyrics. According to Hale, "This album is the story of me carving myself out of that abyss. It is a journey of navigating mental health, debauchery, survival, redemption, rediscovery, and still maintaining faith in humanity."

Critical reception

The album received generally favorable reviews from critics, often based on Lzzy Hale's performance. Wayne Parry of ABC News noted that "Hale manages to pull it off with a deft songwriting touch and a surprising sense of melody that belies the bombast." According to Steve Beebee of Kerrang!, "Lzzy Hale owns the best voice in modern rock – but even she’s never sounded quite this enflamed" and called the album "the best 38 minutes of pure rock you’ve heard this year." 

In the words of Chad Bowar of Metal Injection, "This album does a better job of getting closer to the energy and passion of the band's live shows than the last one [Vicious] did." According to Ed Ford of Rock N' Load, "If people wanted to know what the perfect rock album sounds like, give this a blast, you won’t hear much better."

Accolades

Track listing

Personnel
Halestorm
 Lzzy Hale – vocals, guitar, piano, synthesizer
 Arejay Hale – drums, backing vocals
 Joe Hottinger – lead guitar, backing vocals, synthesizer
 Josh Smith – bass guitar, backing vocals, synthesizer

Additional personnel

 Scott Stevens – production (all tracks); engineering, digital editing (track 1); acoustic guitar, string arrangement (6)
 Nick Raskulinecz – production (all tracks), gang vocals (1)
 Ted Jensen – mastering
 Chris Lord-Alge – mixing
 Nathan Yarborough – engineering
 Nick Spezia – engineering (6)
 Rock Falcon – drum technician
 Calvin Roffey – guitar technician
 Tyler Dragness – guitar technician
 Adam Chagnon – additional engineering
 Brian Judd – mixing assistance
 Alan Umstead – concert master, violin (6)
 Craig Nelson – bass (6)
 Andrew Dunn – cello (6)
 Kevin Bate – cello (6)
 Ron Sorbo – percussion (6)
 Caroly Bailey – violin (6)
 Catherine Umstead – violin (6)
 Janet Darnall – violin (6)
 Jung-Min Shin – violin (6)
 Maria Conti – violin (6)
 Mary Kathryn Vanosdale – violin (6)
 Tiago Nunez – programming (8)

Charts

References

2022 albums
Halestorm albums
Albums impacted by the COVID-19 pandemic